Heliophanus designatus is a species of spider in the family Salticidae, that is found in South Africa.

References 

Endemic fauna of South Africa
Salticidae
Spiders of Africa
Spiders of South Africa
Spiders described in 1903